Gonzalo Marinelli (born 7 February 1989) is an Argentine professional footballer who plays as a goalkeeper for Tigre.

Career
Marinelli began with River Plate in 2011 in Primera B Nacional. He first appeared for the first-team in August by being an unused substitute for league matches against Chacarita Juniors, Independiente Rivadavia and Sportivo Desamparados, along with four further league fixtures during 2011–12 which ended with promotion to the Argentine Primera División. He was an unused sub twice more during 2012–13, prior to leaving the club on loan in July 2013 to join fellow Primera División team Atlético de Rafaela. He made his professional debut for Rafaela on 13 April 2014, it came in a 2–0 defeat to his parent club.

He played once more for Rafaela, versus Rosario Central on 16 April, before returning to River Plate and subsequently joining Huracán permanently. He made just six appearances in four seasons for Huracán in all competitions. On 7 July 2017, Marinelli completed a move to Colón. His debut for Colón arrived in the Copa Argentina against  former club Huracán on 1 September. Tigre signed Marinelli in July 2018.

Career statistics
.

Honours
River Plate
Primera B Nacional: 2011–12

Huracán
Copa Argentina: 2013–14

References

External links

1989 births
Living people
People from José C. Paz Partido
Argentine footballers
Association football goalkeepers
Primera Nacional players
Argentine Primera División players
Club Atlético River Plate footballers
Atlético de Rafaela footballers
Club Atlético Huracán footballers
Club Atlético Colón footballers
Club Atlético Tigre footballers
Sportspeople from Buenos Aires Province